The 2003 Hamilton municipal election was held on November 10, 2003, to elect municipal officials in Hamilton, Ontario. On election day, Hamiltonians elected a mayor, 15 city councillors, and trustees for the Hamilton-Wentworth District School Board, Hamilton-Wentworth Catholic District School Board, Conseil scolaire Viamonde, and Conseil scolaire catholique MonAvenir.

Mayoral election

|-
!rowspan="2" colspan="2"|Candidate
!colspan="3"|Popular vote
|-
! Votes
! %
! ±%
|-
| style="background-color:#FF0000;" |
| style="text-align:left;" | Larry DiIanni
| style="text-align:right;" |70,539
| style="text-align:right;" |50.92%
| style="text-align:right;" | -
|-
| style="background-color:#FF7F00;" |
| style="text-align:left;" | David Christopherson
| style="text-align:right;" |54,298
| style="text-align:right;" |39.20%
| style="text-align:right;" | -
|-
| style="background-color:#2F9C95;" |
| style="text-align:left;" | Dick Wildeman
| style="text-align:right;" |4,462
| style="text-align:right;" |3.22%
| style="text-align:right;" | -
|-
| style="background-color:#939F5C;" |
| style="text-align:left;" | Michael Peters
| style="text-align:right;" |3,270
| style="text-align:right;" |2.36%
| style="text-align:right;" | -
|- 
| style="background-color:#8DB600;" |
| style="text-align:left;" | Tom Murray
| style="text-align:right;" |2,881
| style="text-align:right;" |2.08%
| style="text-align:right;" | -
|-
| style="background-color:#69359C;" |
| style="text-align:left;" | Michael Baldasaro
| style="text-align:right;" |2,569
| style="text-align:right;" |1.85%
| style="text-align:right;" |+0.75%
|-
| style="background-color:#ff1493;" |
| style="text-align:left;" | Matt Jelly
| style="text-align:right;" |510
| style="text-align:right;" |0.37%
| style="text-align:right;" | -
|-
| style="text-align:right;background-color:#FFFFFF;" colspan="2" |Total votes
| style="text-align:right;background-color:#FFFFFF;" |139,902
| style="text-align:right;background-color:#FFFFFF;" |37.97%
| style="text-align:right;background-color:#FFFFFF;" |
|- 
| style="text-align:right;background-color:#FFFFFF;" colspan="2" |Registered voters
| style="text-align:right;background-color:#FFFFFF;" |368,480
| style="text-align:right;background-color:#FFFFFF;" |100%
| style="text-align:right;background-color:#FFFFFF;" |
|- 
| style="text-align:left;" colspan="6" |Note: All Hamilton Municipal Elections are officially non-partisan.  Note: Candidate campaign colours are based on the prominent colour used in campaign items (signs, literature, etc.)and are used as a visual differentiation between candidates.
|- 
| style="text-align:left;" colspan="13" |Sources: 
|}

Larry Di Ianni was first elected to Stoney Creek city council in 1982, where he served until the 2000 amalgamation of Stoney Creek into Hamilton.  He then served as a Hamilton councillor until November 2003. Di Ianni's major policies included the completion of the Red Hill Creek Expressway, business tax reduction, airport development, improving relations among the amalgamated municipalities, and obtaining additional social service funding from the more senior levels of government.
David Christopherson was elected to Hamilton, Ontario City Council in 1985, where he served until 1990, when he was elected to the Ontario Legislature as a New Democrat, where he served, both in government and opposition until 2003. During the NDP's tenure in government from 1990 to 1995, Christopherson held the positions of Minister of Correctional Services and Solicitor-General.
Dick Wildeman was a 61-year-old PhD in pharmacology, and former director of Pharmaceutical Sciences at McMaster University Medical Centre. He led a de-amalgamation slate in the election, attempting to reverse a 2000 decision by the provincial government to amalgamate Hamilton with the neighbouring municipalities of Dundas, Ancaster, Stoney Creek, Flamborough and Glanbrook. His vision on how to do so, though, attempted to recreate the version of local government utilized in 1975, where rural communities bought services from the Hamilton municipality and contributed to 80% of the cost. Local media berated his plan, saying there was "a troubling lack of clarity in how Wildeman envisions" de-amalgamation and that he "doesn't have what it takes to be mayor of the city of Hamilton," because of "huge disconnects in [his] logic."
Michael Peters was a 36-year-old first-time candidate and financial controller for a Burlington electrical company at the time of the election. His major campaign planks focused on supporting the Red Hill Creek Expressway, keeping the newly amalgamated suburban communities united with Greater Hamilton and slowing urban sprawl by supporting industrial brownfield development. Peters also lamented the flight of university educated residents from the city, and was quoted as saying, "Of my group of high school friends who went off to university, not one of them lives here, other than me."
Tom Murray was a 50-year-old electrician at Dofasco and former four-term councillor for Ward 8. During his tenure on council, his aggressive style proved controversial, but he maintained that this would be a strong quality for Hamilton's Mayor to have. His platform included no-tax increases, revitalization of the waterfront, support for the completion of the Red Hill Creek Expressway and ensuring the city focuses on providing essential services while selling off assets like golf courses and entertainment facilities.
Michael Baldasaro was a perennial candidate and the Leader of the Church of the Universe. He stood for Parliament in 1984 and 2000 on a number of different party tickets. In 2003, Baldasaro ran on a platform of monetary rewards for voting, removing City Hall security and legalizing marijuana, prostitution and nudity.
Matt Jelly was born in Hamilton, and was a 21-year-old visual artist at the time of the election. He did not enter the election to win votes, but to gain experience and draw attention to certain issues.  He wanted to give a final decision on amalgamation more time and opposed the Red Hill Creek Expressway, citing the plan's environmental drawbacks, all while humorously ending his campaign speeches with the line, "Don't vote for me, thank you and good night".

City Council Election

Ward One (Chedoke-Cootes)

The race for Ward One councillor was marked by nine-year incumbent councillor Marvin Caplan's faltering support because of a major issue. During the campaign Marvin Caplan openly supported the completion of the Red Hill Creek Expressway, opposed by a majority of Ward One's residents.

Challenger Brian McHattie, who had run for Mayor in 1997, was a 43-year-old environmental consultant at the time of the election, and received support due to his opposition to the Red Hill Creek Expressway. Michael Puskas, the third candidate in the race, was a local lawyer who echoed Caplan's support for the Expressway.

|-
!rowspan="2" colspan="2"|Candidate
!colspan="3"|Popular vote
|-
! Votes
! %
! ±%
|-
| style="background-color:#9b0000;" |
| style="text-align:left;" | Brian McHattie
| style="text-align:right;" | 5,614
| style="text-align:right;" | 57.94%
| style="text-align:right;" | -
|-
| style="background-color:#FF0000;" |
| style="text-align:left;" | Marvin Caplan (incumbent)
| style="text-align:right;" |3,043
| style="text-align:right;" |31.40%
| style="text-align:right;" |+1.33%
|-
| style="background-color:#3eb3e6;" |
| style="text-align:left;" | Michael Puskas
| style="text-align:right;" |1,033
| style="text-align:right;" |10.66%
| style="text-align:right;" | -
|-
| style="text-align:right;background-color:#FFFFFF;" colspan="2" |Total votes
| style="text-align:right;background-color:#FFFFFF;" |9,879
| style="text-align:right;background-color:#FFFFFF;" |100%
| style="text-align:right;background-color:#FFFFFF;" |
|- 
| style="text-align:right;background-color:#FFFFFF;" colspan="2" |Registered voters
| style="text-align:right;background-color:#FFFFFF;" |25,347
| style="text-align:right;background-color:#FFFFFF;" |38.98%
| style="text-align:right;background-color:#FFFFFF;" |
|- 
| style="text-align:left;" colspan="6" |Note: All Hamilton Municipal Elections are officially non-partisan.  Note: Candidate campaign colours are based on the prominent colour used in campaign items (signs, literature, etc.)and are used as a visual differentiation between candidates.
|- 
| style="text-align:left;" colspan="13" |Sources: 
|}

Ward Two (Downtown)

|-
!rowspan="2" colspan="2"|Candidate
!colspan="3"|Popular vote
|-
! Votes
! %
! ±%
|-
| style="background-color:#F39237;" |
| style="text-align:left;" | Andrea Horwath (incumbent)
| style="text-align:right;" | 4,601
| style="text-align:right;" | 63.81%
| style="text-align:right;" | +13.7%
|-
| style="background-color:#769eb0;" |
| style="text-align:left;" | James Novak
| style="text-align:right;" |1,993
| style="text-align:right;" |27.64%
| style="text-align:right;" | -
|-
| style="background-color:#a457d4;" |
| style="text-align:left;" | Ronald Berenbaum
| style="text-align:right;" |325
| style="text-align:right;" |4.51%
| style="text-align:right;" | -
|-
| style="background-color:#adfa96;" |
| style="text-align:left;" | Jerry Moore
| style="text-align:right;" |291
| style="text-align:right;" |4.04%
| style="text-align:right;" | -
|-
| style="text-align:right;background-color:#FFFFFF;" colspan="2" |Total votes
| style="text-align:right;background-color:#FFFFFF;" |7,443
| style="text-align:right;background-color:#FFFFFF;" |100%
| style="text-align:right;background-color:#FFFFFF;" |
|- 
| style="text-align:right;background-color:#FFFFFF;" colspan="2" |Registered voters
| style="text-align:right;background-color:#FFFFFF;" |26,578
| style="text-align:right;background-color:#FFFFFF;" |28%
| style="text-align:right;background-color:#FFFFFF;" |
|- 
| style="text-align:left;" colspan="6" |Note: All Hamilton Municipal Elections are officially non-partisan.  Note: Candidate campaign colours are based on the prominent colour used in campaign items (signs, literature, etc.)and are used as a visual differentiation between candidates.
|- 
| style="text-align:left;" colspan="13" |Sources: 
|}

Ward Three (Hamilton Centre)

|-
!rowspan="2" colspan="2"|Candidate
!colspan="3"|Popular vote
|-
! Votes
! %
! ±%
|-
| style="background-color:#FF0000;" |
| style="text-align:left;" | Bernie Morelli (incumbent)
| style="text-align:right;" | 4,802
| style="text-align:right;" | 67.48%
| style="text-align:right;" | +8.61%
|-
| style="background-color:#4684b0;" |
| style="text-align:left;" | John Best
| style="text-align:right;" |2,017
| style="text-align:right;" |28.34%
| style="text-align:right;" | -
|-
| style="background-color:#c48704" |
| style="text-align:left;" | Robert Westbrook
| style="text-align:right;" |297
| style="text-align:right;" |4.17%
| style="text-align:right;" | -
|-
| style="text-align:right;background-color:#FFFFFF;" colspan="2" |Total votes
| style="text-align:right;background-color:#FFFFFF;" |7,410
| style="text-align:right;background-color:#FFFFFF;" |100%
| style="text-align:right;background-color:#FFFFFF;" |
|- 
| style="text-align:right;background-color:#FFFFFF;" colspan="2" |Registered voters
| style="text-align:right;background-color:#FFFFFF;" |29,223
| style="text-align:right;background-color:#FFFFFF;" |25.36%
| style="text-align:right;background-color:#FFFFFF;" |
|- 
| style="text-align:left;" colspan="6" |Note: All Hamilton Municipal Elections are officially non-partisan.  Note: Candidate campaign colours are based on the prominent colour used in campaign items (signs, literature, etc.)and are used as a visual differentiation between candidates.
|- 
| style="text-align:left;" colspan="13" |Sources: 
|}

Ward Four (East Hamilton)

|-
!rowspan="2" colspan="2"|Candidate
!colspan="3"|Popular vote
|-
! Votes
! %
! ±%
|-
| style="background-color:#FF7F00;" |
| style="text-align:left;" | Sam Merulla (incumbent)
| style="text-align:right;" | 5,015
| style="text-align:right;" | 54.22%
| style="text-align:right;" | +6.3%
|-
| style="background-color:#006e05;" |
| style="text-align:left;" | Lynda Lukasik
| style="text-align:right;" |3,430
| style="text-align:right;" |37.09%
| style="text-align:right;" | -
|-
| style="background-color:#3c538c;" |
| style="text-align:left;" | James Byron
| style="text-align:right;" |668
| style="text-align:right;" |7.22%
| style="text-align:right;" | -
|-
| style="background-color:#bd405d;" |
| style="text-align:left;" | Carmen Misale
| style="text-align:right;" |136
| style="text-align:right;" |1.47%
| style="text-align:right;" | -
|-
| style="text-align:right;background-color:#FFFFFF;" colspan="2" |Total votes
| style="text-align:right;background-color:#FFFFFF;" |9,366
| style="text-align:right;background-color:#FFFFFF;" |100%
| style="text-align:right;background-color:#FFFFFF;" |
|- 
| style="text-align:right;background-color:#FFFFFF;" colspan="2" |Registered voters
| style="text-align:right;background-color:#FFFFFF;" |27,014
| style="text-align:right;background-color:#FFFFFF;" |34.67%
| style="text-align:right;background-color:#FFFFFF;" |
|- 
| style="text-align:left;" colspan="6" |Note: All Hamilton Municipal Elections are officially non-partisan.  Note: Candidate campaign colours are based on the prominent colour used in campaign items (signs, literature, etc.)and are used as a visual differentiation between candidates.
|- 
| style="text-align:left;" colspan="13" |Sources: 
|}

Ward Five (Redhill)

|-
!rowspan="2" colspan="2"|Candidate
!colspan="3"|Popular vote
|-
! Votes
! %
! ±%
|-
| style="background-color:#FF0000;" |
| style="text-align:left;" | Chad Collins (incumbent)
| style="text-align:right;" | 8.077
| style="text-align:right;" | 75.20%
| style="text-align:right;" | -11.85%
|-
| style="background-color:#4c7591;" |
| style="text-align:left;" | Andrew Schroeder
| style="text-align:right;" |2,663
| style="text-align:right;" |24.80%
| style="text-align:right;" | -
|-
| style="text-align:right;background-color:#FFFFFF;" colspan="2" |Total votes
| style="text-align:right;background-color:#FFFFFF;" |10,946
| style="text-align:right;background-color:#FFFFFF;" |100%
| style="text-align:right;background-color:#FFFFFF;" |
|- 
| style="text-align:right;background-color:#FFFFFF;" colspan="2" |Registered voters
| style="text-align:right;background-color:#FFFFFF;" |28,545
| style="text-align:right;background-color:#FFFFFF;" |38.35%
| style="text-align:right;background-color:#FFFFFF;" |
|- 
| style="text-align:left;" colspan="6" |Note: All Hamilton Municipal Elections are officially non-partisan.  Note: Candidate campaign colours are based on the prominent colour used in campaign items (signs, literature, etc.)and are used as a visual differentiation between candidates.
|- 
| style="text-align:left;" colspan="13" |Sources: 
|}

Ward Six (East Mountain)

|-
!rowspan="2" colspan="2"|Candidate
!colspan="3"|Popular vote
|-
! Votes
! %
! ±%
|-
| style="background-color:#002E63;" |
| style="text-align:left;" | Tom Jackson (incumbent)
| style="text-align:right;" | 9.012
| style="text-align:right;" | 74.83%
| style="text-align:right;" | -13.77%
|-
| style="background-color:#ffb41f;" |
| style="text-align:left;" | Kevin Beattie
| style="text-align:right;" |1,446
| style="text-align:right;" |12.01%
| style="text-align:right;" | -
|-
| style="background-color:#a60f16;" |
| style="text-align:left;" | Peter O'Hagan
| style="text-align:right;" |916
| style="text-align:right;" |7.61%
| style="text-align:right;" | -
|-
| style="background-color:#267029;" |
| style="text-align:left;" | Shauna McShane
| style="text-align:right;" |670
| style="text-align:right;" |6.70%
| style="text-align:right;" | -
|-
| style="text-align:right;background-color:#FFFFFF;" colspan="2" |Total votes
| style="text-align:right;background-color:#FFFFFF;" |12,297
| style="text-align:right;background-color:#FFFFFF;" |100%
| style="text-align:right;background-color:#FFFFFF;" |
|- 
| style="text-align:right;background-color:#FFFFFF;" colspan="2" |Registered voters
| style="text-align:right;background-color:#FFFFFF;" |29,778
| style="text-align:right;background-color:#FFFFFF;" |41.30%
| style="text-align:right;background-color:#FFFFFF;" |
|- 
| style="text-align:left;" colspan="6" |Note: All Hamilton Municipal Elections are officially non-partisan.  Note: Candidate campaign colours are based on the prominent colour used in campaign items (signs, literature, etc.)and are used as a visual differentiation between candidates.
|- 
| style="text-align:left;" colspan="13" |Sources: 
|}

Ward Seven (Central Mountain)

|-
!rowspan="2" colspan="2"|Candidate
!colspan="3"|Popular vote
|-
! Votes
! %
! ±%
|-
| style="background-color:#FF0800;" |
| style="text-align:left;" | Bill Kelly (incumbent)
| style="text-align:right;" | 10,699
| style="text-align:right;" | 64.66%
| style="text-align:right;" | +3.83%
|-
| style="background-color:#00008B;" |
| style="text-align:left;" | Henry Merling
| style="text-align:right;" |3,540
| style="text-align:right;" |21.39%
| style="text-align:right;" | -
|-
| style="background-color:#FF003F;" |
| style="text-align:left;" | John Gallagher
| style="text-align:right;" |1,340
| style="text-align:right;" |8.10%
| style="text-align:right;" | -
|-
| style="background-color:#64dedc;" |
| style="text-align:left;" | Bill Cottrell
| style="text-align:right;" |968
| style="text-align:right;" |5.85%
| style="text-align:right;" | -
|-
| style="text-align:right;background-color:#FFFFFF;" colspan="2" |Total votes
| style="text-align:right;background-color:#FFFFFF;" |16,765
| style="text-align:right;background-color:#FFFFFF;" |100%
| style="text-align:right;background-color:#FFFFFF;" |
|- 
| style="text-align:right;background-color:#FFFFFF;" colspan="2" |Registered voters
| style="text-align:right;background-color:#FFFFFF;" |40,749
| style="text-align:right;background-color:#FFFFFF;" |41.14%
| style="text-align:right;background-color:#FFFFFF;" |
|- 
| style="text-align:left;" colspan="6" |Note: All Hamilton Municipal Elections are officially non-partisan.  Note: Candidate campaign colours are based on the prominent colour used in campaign items (signs, literature, etc.)and are used as a visual differentiation between candidates.
|- 
| style="text-align:left;" colspan="13" |Sources: 
|}

Ward Eight (West Mountain)

|-
!rowspan="2" colspan="2"|Candidate
!colspan="3"|Popular vote
|-
! Votes
! %
! ±%
|-
| style="background-color:#FF0800;" |
| style="text-align:left;" | Terry Whitehead 
| style="text-align:right;" | 4,135
| style="text-align:right;" | 27.13%
| style="text-align:right;" | -
|-
| style="background-color:#cf6b4a;" |
| style="text-align:left;" | Jamie West
| style="text-align:right;" |3,816
| style="text-align:right;" |24.62%
| style="text-align:right;" | -
|-
| style="background-color:#40BCD8;" |
| style="text-align:left;" | George Morasse
| style="text-align:right;" |3,081
| style="text-align:right;" |20.22%
| style="text-align:right;" | +5.41%
|-
| style="background-color:#3ABEFF;" |
| style="text-align:left;" | Peter Martin
| style="text-align:right;" |2,280
| style="text-align:right;" |14.96%
| style="text-align:right;" | -
|-
| style="background-color:#077d0b;" |
| style="text-align:left;" | Naseem Jamil
| style="text-align:right;" |978
| style="text-align:right;" |6.42%
| style="text-align:right;" | -
|-
| style="background-color:#7952a1;" |
| style="text-align:left;" | Roman Sarachman
| style="text-align:right;" |789
| style="text-align:right;" |5.18%
| style="text-align:right;" | -
|-
| style="background-color:#06D6A0;" |
| style="text-align:left;" | Wayne Boychuk
| style="text-align:right;" |160
| style="text-align:right;" |1.05%
| style="text-align:right;" | -0.45%
|-
| style="text-align:right;background-color:#FFFFFF;" colspan="2" |Total votes
| style="text-align:right;background-color:#FFFFFF;" |15,501
| style="text-align:right;background-color:#FFFFFF;" |100%
| style="text-align:right;background-color:#FFFFFF;" |
|- 
| style="text-align:right;background-color:#FFFFFF;" colspan="2" |Registered voters
| style="text-align:right;background-color:#FFFFFF;" |34,607
| style="text-align:right;background-color:#FFFFFF;" |44.79%
| style="text-align:right;background-color:#FFFFFF;" |
|- 
| style="text-align:left;" colspan="6" |Note: All Hamilton Municipal Elections are officially non-partisan.  Note: Candidate campaign colours are based on the prominent colour used in campaign items (signs, literature, etc.)and are used as a visual differentiation between candidates.
|- 
| style="text-align:left;" colspan="13" |Sources: 
|}

Ward Nine (Upper Stoney Creek)

|-
!rowspan="2" colspan="2"|Candidate
!colspan="3"|Popular vote
|-
! Votes
! %
! ±%
|-
| style="background-color:#B2D3A8;" |
| style="text-align:left;" | Phil Bruckler 
| style="text-align:right;" | 3,946
| style="text-align:right;" | 53.80%
| style="text-align:right;" | -
|-
| style="background-color:#FF0800;" |
| style="text-align:left;" | Anne Bain (Incumbent)
| style="text-align:right;" |3,032
| style="text-align:right;" |41.34%
| style="text-align:right;" | +5.56%
|-
| style="background-color:#8bd3f0;" |
| style="text-align:left;" | Tim Riach
| style="text-align:right;" |192
| style="text-align:right;" |2.62%
| style="text-align:right;" | -
|-
| style="background-color:#21036e;" |
| style="text-align:left;" | Abe Din
| style="text-align:right;" |164
| style="text-align:right;" |2.25%
| style="text-align:right;" | -
|-
| style="text-align:right;background-color:#FFFFFF;" colspan="2" |Total votes
| style="text-align:right;background-color:#FFFFFF;" |7,521
| style="text-align:right;background-color:#FFFFFF;" |100%
| style="text-align:right;background-color:#FFFFFF;" |
|- 
| style="text-align:right;background-color:#FFFFFF;" colspan="2" |Registered voters
| style="text-align:right;background-color:#FFFFFF;" |18,614
| style="text-align:right;background-color:#FFFFFF;" |40.41%
| style="text-align:right;background-color:#FFFFFF;" |
|- 
| style="text-align:left;" colspan="6" |Note: All Hamilton Municipal Elections are officially non-partisan.  Note: Candidate campaign colours are based on the prominent colour used in campaign items (signs, literature, etc.)and are used as a visual differentiation between candidates.
|- 
| style="text-align:left;" colspan="13" |Sources: 
|}

Ward Ten (Lower Stoney Creek)

|-
!rowspan="2" colspan="2"|Candidate
!colspan="3"|Popular vote
|-
! Votes
! %
! ±%
|-
| style="background-color:#ED1C24;" |
| style="text-align:left;" | Maria Pearson 
| style="text-align:right;" | 3,322
| style="text-align:right;" | 36.97%
| style="text-align:right;" | +4.76%
|-
| style="background-color:#1d27b5;" |
| style="text-align:left;" | John Santarelli
| style="text-align:right;" |2,659
| style="text-align:right;" |29.59%
| style="text-align:right;" | -
|-
| style="background-color:#e86c4e;" |
| style="text-align:left;" | Louie Milojevic
| style="text-align:right;" |1,322
| style="text-align:right;" |14.71%
| style="text-align:right;" | -
|-
| style="background-color:#FF7F00;" |
| style="text-align:left;" | Robert Barlow
| style="text-align:right;" |1,016
| style="text-align:right;" |11.31%
| style="text-align:right;" | -
|-
| style="background-color:#fdff91;" |
| style="text-align:left;" | Jim Davis
| style="text-align:right;" |419
| style="text-align:right;" |4.66%
| style="text-align:right;" | -
|-
| style="background-color:#93f5e4;" |
| style="text-align:left;" | Jeff Corradetti
| style="text-align:right;" |247
| style="text-align:right;" |2.75%
| style="text-align:right;" | -
|-
| style="text-align:right;background-color:#FFFFFF;" colspan="2" |Total votes
| style="text-align:right;background-color:#FFFFFF;" |9,141
| style="text-align:right;background-color:#FFFFFF;" |100%
| style="text-align:right;background-color:#FFFFFF;" |
|- 
| style="text-align:right;background-color:#FFFFFF;" colspan="2" |Registered voters
| style="text-align:right;background-color:#FFFFFF;" |19,798
| style="text-align:right;background-color:#FFFFFF;" |46.17%
| style="text-align:right;background-color:#FFFFFF;" |
|- 
| style="text-align:left;" colspan="6" |Note: All Hamilton Municipal Elections are officially non-partisan.  Note: Candidate campaign colours are based on the prominent colour used in campaign items (signs, literature, etc.)and are used as a visual differentiation between candidates.
|- 
| style="text-align:left;" colspan="13" |Sources: 
|}

Ward Eleven (Glanbrook Winona)

|-
!rowspan="2" colspan="2"|Candidate
!colspan="3"|Popular vote
|-
! Votes
! %
! ±%
|-
| style="background-color:#41f4f4;" |
| style="text-align:left;" | David Mitchell (incumbent)
!colspan="3" style="text-align:center;" | Acclaimed
|-
| style="text-align:right;background-color:#FFFFFF;" colspan="2" |Total votes
| style="text-align:right;background-color:#FFFFFF;" |6,768
| style="text-align:right;background-color:#FFFFFF;" |100%
| style="text-align:right;background-color:#FFFFFF;" |
|- 
| style="text-align:right;background-color:#FFFFFF;" colspan="2" |Registered voters
| style="text-align:right;background-color:#FFFFFF;" |18,082
| style="text-align:right;background-color:#FFFFFF;" |37.43%
| style="text-align:right;background-color:#FFFFFF;" |
|- 
| style="text-align:left;" colspan="6" |Note: For this election, voter-turnout is just for the position of Mayor and School Board Trustees in that  the councillor's position was acclaimed.  Note: All Hamilton Municipal Elections are officially non-partisan.  Note: Candidate campaign colours are based on the prominent colour used in campaign items (signs, literature, etc.)and are used as a visual differentiation between candidates.
|- 
| style="text-align:left;" colspan="13" |Sources: 
|}

Ward Twelve (Ancaster)

|-
!rowspan="2" colspan="2"|Candidate
!colspan="3"|Popular vote
|-
! Votes
! %
! ±%
|-
| style="background-color:#C32148;" |
| style="text-align:left;" | Murray Ferguson (Incumbent) 
| style="text-align:right;" | 5,967
| style="text-align:right;" | 69.03%
| style="text-align:right;" | +16.6%
|-
| style="background-color:#FF0000;" |
| style="text-align:left;" | Bryan Kerman
| style="text-align:right;" |2,677
| style="text-align:right;" |30.97%
| style="text-align:right;" | +5.01%
|-
| style="text-align:right;background-color:#FFFFFF;" colspan="2" |Total votes
| style="text-align:right;background-color:#FFFFFF;" |8,816
| style="text-align:right;background-color:#FFFFFF;" |100%
| style="text-align:right;background-color:#FFFFFF;" |
|- 
| style="text-align:right;background-color:#FFFFFF;" colspan="2" |Registered voters
| style="text-align:right;background-color:#FFFFFF;" |20,924
| style="text-align:right;background-color:#FFFFFF;" |42.13%
| style="text-align:right;background-color:#FFFFFF;" |
|- 
| style="text-align:left;" colspan="6" |Note: All Hamilton Municipal Elections are officially non-partisan.  Note: Candidate campaign colours are based on the prominent colour used in campaign items (signs, literature, etc.)and are used as a visual differentiation between candidates.
|- 
| style="text-align:left;" colspan="13" |Sources: 
|}

Ward Thirteen (Dundas)

|-
!rowspan="2" colspan="2"|Candidate
!colspan="3"|Popular vote
|-
! Votes
! %
! ±%
|-
| style="background-color:#C32148;" |
| style="text-align:left;" | Russ Powers (Incumbent) 
| style="text-align:right;" | 5,184
| style="text-align:right;" | 71.39%
| style="text-align:right;" | +12.92%
|-
| style="background-color:#515ae0;" |
| style="text-align:left;" | David Longo
| style="text-align:right;" |2,078
| style="text-align:right;" |28.81%
| style="text-align:right;" | -
|-
| style="text-align:right;background-color:#FFFFFF;" colspan="2" |Total votes
| style="text-align:right;background-color:#FFFFFF;" |7,544
| style="text-align:right;background-color:#FFFFFF;" |100%
| style="text-align:right;background-color:#FFFFFF;" |
|- 
| style="text-align:right;background-color:#FFFFFF;" colspan="2" |Registered voters
| style="text-align:right;background-color:#FFFFFF;" |18,635
| style="text-align:right;background-color:#FFFFFF;" |40.48%
| style="text-align:right;background-color:#FFFFFF;" |
|- 
| style="text-align:left;" colspan="6" |Note: All Hamilton Municipal Elections are officially non-partisan.  Note: Candidate campaign colours are based on the prominent colour used in campaign items (signs, literature, etc.)and are used as a visual differentiation between candidates.
|- 
| style="text-align:left;" colspan="13" |Sources: 
|}

Ward Fourteen (Wentworth)

|-
!rowspan="2" colspan="2"|Candidate
!colspan="3"|Popular vote
|-
! Votes
! %
! ±%
|-
| style="background-color:#bfad6b;" |
| style="text-align:left;" | Dave Braden (Incumbent) 
| style="text-align:right;" | 2,350
| style="text-align:right;" | 50.92%
| style="text-align:right;" | +3.49%
|-
| style="background-color:#a6193e;" |
| style="text-align:left;" | Don Robertson
| style="text-align:right;" |2,265
| style="text-align:right;" |49.08%
| style="text-align:right;" | -
|-
| style="text-align:right;background-color:#FFFFFF;" colspan="2" |Total votes
| style="text-align:right;background-color:#FFFFFF;" |4,662
| style="text-align:right;background-color:#FFFFFF;" |100%
| style="text-align:right;background-color:#FFFFFF;" |
|- 
| style="text-align:right;background-color:#FFFFFF;" colspan="2" |Registered voters
| style="text-align:right;background-color:#FFFFFF;" |12,519
| style="text-align:right;background-color:#FFFFFF;" |37.24%
| style="text-align:right;background-color:#FFFFFF;" |
|- 
| style="text-align:left;" colspan="6" |Note: All Hamilton Municipal Elections are officially non-partisan.  Note: Candidate campaign colours are based on the prominent colour used in campaign items (signs, literature, etc.)and are used as a visual differentiation between candidates.
|- 
| style="text-align:left;" colspan="13" |Sources: 
|}

Ward Fifteen (Flamborough)

|-
!rowspan="2" colspan="2"|Candidate
!colspan="3"|Popular vote
|-
! Votes
! %
! ±%
|-
| style="background-color:#02C3BD;" |
| style="text-align:left;" | Margaret McCarthy (Incumbent) 
| style="text-align:right;" | 2,924
| style="text-align:right;" | 50.43%
| style="text-align:right;" | -7.24%
|-
| style="background-color:#87b6e6;" |
| style="text-align:left;" | Arend Kersten
| style="text-align:right;" |2,346
| style="text-align:right;" |40.46%
| style="text-align:right;" | +14.4% (Note 1)
|-
| style="background-color:#5384d4;" |
| style="text-align:left;" | Richard Sams
| style="text-align:right;" |440
| style="text-align:right;" |7.59%
| style="text-align:right;" | -
|-
| style="background-color:#db9721;" |
| style="text-align:left;" | Stan Johnson
| style="text-align:right;" |88
| style="text-align:right;" |1.52%
| style="text-align:right;" | -
|-
| style="text-align:right;background-color:#FFFFFF;" colspan="2" |Total votes
| style="text-align:right;background-color:#FFFFFF;" |5,843
| style="text-align:right;background-color:#FFFFFF;" |100%
| style="text-align:right;background-color:#FFFFFF;" |
|- 
| style="text-align:right;background-color:#FFFFFF;" colspan="2" |Registered voters
| style="text-align:right;background-color:#FFFFFF;" |18,067
| style="text-align:right;background-color:#FFFFFF;" |32.34%
| style="text-align:right;background-color:#FFFFFF;" |
|- 
| style="text-align:left;" colspan="6" |Note 1: Total is compared with Kersten's precentage in Ward 14 in 2000Note: All Hamilton Municipal Elections are officially non-partisan.  Note: Candidate campaign colours are based on the prominent colour used in campaign items (signs, literature, etc.)and are used as a visual differentiation between candidates.
|- 
| style="text-align:left;" colspan="13" |Sources: 
|}

Public School Board Election

The 2003 election for trustees to the Hamilton-Wentworth District School Board was marked by numerous acclamations, despite the board being put under provincial supervision from August 2002 to October 2003 for failing to pass a balanced budget. A provincial report critiqued trustees and the supervisor placed in charge of the board accused trustees of being "parent advocates, rather than system leaders".

|-
!rowspan="2" colspan="2"|Candidate
!colspan="3"|Popular vote
|-
! Votes
! %
! ±%
|-
| style="background-color:#B57EDC;" |
| style="text-align:left;" | Judith Bishop (incumbent)
!colspan="3" style="text-align:center;" | Acclaimed
|-
| style="text-align:right;background-color:#FFFFFF;" colspan="2" |Total votes
| style="text-align:right;background-color:#FFFFFF;" |
| style="text-align:right;background-color:#FFFFFF;" |
| style="text-align:right;" |
|- 
| style="text-align:right;background-color:#FFFFFF;" colspan="2" |Registered voters
| style="text-align:right;background-color:#FFFFFF;" |
| style="text-align:right;background-color:#FFFFFF;" |
| style="text-align:right;" |
|- 
| style="text-align:left;" colspan="6" |Note: All Hamilton Municipal Elections are officially non-partisan.  Note: Candidate campaign colours are based on the prominent colour used in campaign items (signs, literature, etc.)and are used as a visual differentiation between candidates.
|- 
| style="text-align:left;" colspan="13" |Sources: 
|}

|-
!rowspan="2" colspan="2"|Candidate
!colspan="3"|Popular vote
|-
! Votes
! %
! ±%
|-
| style="background-color:#c72852;" |
| style="text-align:left;" | Eleanor Johnstone
| style="text-align:right;" | 3,129
| style="text-align:right;" | 72.41%
| style="text-align:right;" | -
|-
| style="background-color:#cd9cff;" |
| style="text-align:left;" | Jean Lewis Knight
| style="text-align:right;" | 1,192
| style="text-align:right;" | 27.59%
| style="text-align:right;" | -
|-
| style="text-align:right;background-color:#FFFFFF;" colspan="2" |Total votes
| style="text-align:right;background-color:#FFFFFF;" |4,321
| style="text-align:right;background-color:#FFFFFF;" |
| style="text-align:right;" |
|- 
| style="text-align:right;background-color:#FFFFFF;" colspan="2" |Registered voters
| style="text-align:right;background-color:#FFFFFF;" |
| style="text-align:right;background-color:#FFFFFF;" |
| style="text-align:right;" |
|- 
| style="text-align:left;" colspan="6" |Note: All Hamilton Municipal Elections are officially non-partisan.  Note: Candidate campaign colours are based on the prominent colour used in campaign items (signs, literature, etc.)and are used as a visual differentiation between candidates.
|- 
| style="text-align:left;" colspan="13" |Sources: 
|}

|-
!rowspan="2" colspan="2"|Candidate
!colspan="3"|Popular vote
|-
! Votes
! %
! ±%
|-
| style="background-color:#8DB600"|
| style="text-align:left;" | Ray Mulholland (incumbent)
!colspan="3" style="text-align:center;" | Acclaimed
|-
| style="text-align:right;background-color:#FFFFFF;" colspan="2" |Total votes
| style="text-align:right;background-color:#FFFFFF;" |
| style="text-align:right;background-color:#FFFFFF;" |
| style="text-align:right;" |
|- 
| style="text-align:right;background-color:#FFFFFF;" colspan="2" |Registered voters
| style="text-align:right;background-color:#FFFFFF;" |
| style="text-align:right;background-color:#FFFFFF;" |
| style="text-align:right;" |
|- 
| style="text-align:left;" colspan="6" |Note: All Hamilton Municipal Elections are officially non-partisan.  Note: Candidate campaign colours are based on the prominent colour used in campaign items (signs, literature, etc.)and are used as a visual differentiation between candidates.
|- 
| style="text-align:left;" colspan="13" |Sources: 
|}

|-
!rowspan="2" colspan="2"|Candidate
!colspan="3"|Popular vote
|-
! Votes
! %
! ±%
|-
| style="background-color:#e5a309"|
| style="text-align:left;" | Wayne Marston (incumbent)
!colspan="3" style="text-align:center;" | Acclaimed
|-
| style="text-align:right;background-color:#FFFFFF;" colspan="2" |Total votes
| style="text-align:right;background-color:#FFFFFF;" |
| style="text-align:right;background-color:#FFFFFF;" |
| style="text-align:right;" |
|- 
| style="text-align:right;background-color:#FFFFFF;" colspan="2" |Registered voters
| style="text-align:right;background-color:#FFFFFF;" |
| style="text-align:right;background-color:#FFFFFF;" |
| style="text-align:right;" |
|- 
| style="text-align:left;" colspan="6" |Note: All Hamilton Municipal Elections are officially non-partisan.  Note: Candidate campaign colours are based on the prominent colour used in campaign items (signs, literature, etc.)and are used as a visual differentiation between candidates.
|- 
| style="text-align:left;" colspan="13" |Sources: 
|}

|-
!rowspan="2" colspan="2"|Candidate
!colspan="3"|Popular vote
|-
! Votes
! %
! ±%
|-
| style="background-color:#663854;" |
| style="text-align:left;" | Kathy Archer
| style="text-align:right;" | 3,267
| style="text-align:right;" | 45.38%
| style="text-align:right;" | -
|-
| style="background-color:#00BFFF;" |
| style="text-align:left;" | Laura Peddle (incumbent)
| style="text-align:right;" | 3,202
| style="text-align:right;" | 44.48%
| style="text-align:right;" | -
|-
| style="background-color:#e6cb63;" |
| style="text-align:left;" | Alan Zill
| style="text-align:right;" | 730
| style="text-align:right;" | 10.14%
| style="text-align:right;" | -
|-
| style="text-align:right;background-color:#FFFFFF;" colspan="2" |Total votes
| style="text-align:right;background-color:#FFFFFF;" |7,199
| style="text-align:right;background-color:#FFFFFF;" |
| style="text-align:right;" |
|- 
| style="text-align:right;background-color:#FFFFFF;" colspan="2" |Registered voters
| style="text-align:right;background-color:#FFFFFF;" |
| style="text-align:right;background-color:#FFFFFF;" |
| style="text-align:right;" |
|- 
| style="text-align:left;" colspan="6" |Note: All Hamilton Municipal Elections are officially non-partisan.  Note: Candidate campaign colours are based on the prominent colour used in campaign items (signs, literature, etc.)and are used as a visual differentiation between candidates.
|- 
| style="text-align:left;" colspan="13" |Sources: 
|}

|-
!rowspan="2" colspan="2"|Candidate
!colspan="3"|Popular vote
|-
! Votes
! %
! ±%
|-
| style="background-color:#99BADD;" |
| style="text-align:left;" | Lillian Orban (incumbent)
| style="text-align:right;" | 6,103
| style="text-align:right;" | 60.62%
| style="text-align:right;" | -
|-
| style="background-color:#274690;" |
| style="text-align:left;" | Mark-Alan Whittle
| style="text-align:right;" | 2,235
| style="text-align:right;" | 22.20%
| style="text-align:right;" | -
|-
| style="background-color:#67b5d6;" |
| style="text-align:left;" | Alex Colic
| style="text-align:right;" | 1,729
| style="text-align:right;" | 17.17%
| style="text-align:right;" | -
|-
| style="text-align:right;background-color:#FFFFFF;" colspan="2" |Total votes
| style="text-align:right;background-color:#FFFFFF;" |10,067
| style="text-align:right;background-color:#FFFFFF;" |
| style="text-align:right;" |
|- 
| style="text-align:right;background-color:#FFFFFF;" colspan="2" |Registered voters
| style="text-align:right;background-color:#FFFFFF;" |
| style="text-align:right;background-color:#FFFFFF;" |
| style="text-align:right;" |
|- 
| style="text-align:left;" colspan="6" |Note: All Hamilton Municipal Elections are officially non-partisan.  Note: Candidate campaign colours are based on the prominent colour used in campaign items (signs, literature, etc.)and are used as a visual differentiation between candidates.
|- 
| style="text-align:left;" colspan="13" |Sources: 
|}

|-
!rowspan="2" colspan="2"|Candidate
!colspan="3"|Popular vote
|-
! Votes
! %
! ±%
|-
| style="background-color:#0047AB;" |
| style="text-align:left;" | Al Pierce
| style="text-align:right;" | 4,767
| style="text-align:right;" | 55.55%
| style="text-align:right;" | -
|-
| style="background-color:#A3C1AD;" |
| style="text-align:left;" | Sylvia Thomas
| style="text-align:right;" | 3,814
| style="text-align:right;" | 44.45%
| style="text-align:right;" | -
|-
| style="text-align:right;background-color:#FFFFFF;" colspan="2" |Total votes
| style="text-align:right;background-color:#FFFFFF;" |8,581
| style="text-align:right;background-color:#FFFFFF;" |
| style="text-align:right;" |
|- 
| style="text-align:right;background-color:#FFFFFF;" colspan="2" |Registered voters
| style="text-align:right;background-color:#FFFFFF;" |
| style="text-align:right;background-color:#FFFFFF;" |
| style="text-align:right;" |
|- 
| style="text-align:left;" colspan="6" |Note: All Hamilton Municipal Elections are officially non-partisan.  Note: Candidate campaign colours are based on the prominent colour used in campaign items (signs, literature, etc.)and are used as a visual differentiation between candidates.
|- 
| style="text-align:left;" colspan="13" |Sources: 
|}

|-
!rowspan="2" colspan="2"|Candidate
!colspan="3"|Popular vote
|-
! Votes
! %
! ±%
|-
| style="background-color:#00BFFF;" |
| style="text-align:left;" | John Davidson
| style="text-align:right;" | 5,111
| style="text-align:right;" | 64.48%
| style="text-align:right;" | -
|-
| style="background-color:#32a852;" |
| style="text-align:left;" | Dave Murphy
| style="text-align:right;" | 2,815
| style="text-align:right;" | 35.52%
| style="text-align:right;" | -
|-
| style="text-align:right;background-color:#FFFFFF;" colspan="2" |Total votes
| style="text-align:right;background-color:#FFFFFF;" |7,926
| style="text-align:right;background-color:#FFFFFF;" |
| style="text-align:right;" |
|- 
| style="text-align:right;background-color:#FFFFFF;" colspan="2" |Registered voters
| style="text-align:right;background-color:#FFFFFF;" |
| style="text-align:right;background-color:#FFFFFF;" |
| style="text-align:right;" |
|- 
| style="text-align:left;" colspan="6" |Note: All Hamilton Municipal Elections are officially non-partisan.  Note: Candidate campaign colours are based on the prominent colour used in campaign items (signs, literature, etc.)and are used as a visual differentiation between candidates.
|- 
| style="text-align:left;" colspan="13" |Sources: 
|}

|-
!rowspan="2" colspan="2"|Candidate
!colspan="3"|Popular vote
|-
! Votes
! %
! ±%
|-
| style="background-color:#1453ba;" |
| style="text-align:left;" | Ian Thompson
| style="text-align:right;" | 4,650
| style="text-align:right;" | 51.82%
| style="text-align:right;" | -
|-
| style="background-color:#54457F;" |
| style="text-align:left;" | Jim Enos
| style="text-align:right;" | 3,031
| style="text-align:right;" | 33.78%
| style="text-align:right;" | -
|-
| style="background-color:#d7f048;" |
| style="text-align:left;" | Kenneth Audziss
| style="text-align:right;" | 1,293
| style="text-align:right;" | 14.41%
| style="text-align:right;" | -
|-
| style="text-align:right;background-color:#FFFFFF;" colspan="2" |Total votes
| style="text-align:right;background-color:#FFFFFF;" |8,974
| style="text-align:right;background-color:#FFFFFF;" |
| style="text-align:right;" |
|- 
| style="text-align:right;background-color:#FFFFFF;" colspan="2" |Registered voters
| style="text-align:right;background-color:#FFFFFF;" |
| style="text-align:right;background-color:#FFFFFF;" |
| style="text-align:right;" |
|- 
| style="text-align:left;" colspan="6" |Note: All Hamilton Municipal Elections are officially non-partisan.  Note: Candidate campaign colours are based on the prominent colour used in campaign items (signs, literature, etc.)and are used as a visual differentiation between candidates.
|- 
| style="text-align:left;" colspan="13" |Sources: 
|}

|-
!rowspan="2" colspan="2"|Candidate
!colspan="3"|Popular vote
|-
! Votes
! %
! ±%
|-
| style="background-color:#FF7F00;" |
| style="text-align:left;" | Jessica Brennan
| style="text-align:right;" | 3,145
| style="text-align:right;" | 57.41%
| style="text-align:right;" | -
|-
| style="background-color:#0db50f;" |
| style="text-align:left;" | Mark Coakley
| style="text-align:right;" | 1,850
| style="text-align:right;" | 33.77%
| style="text-align:right;" | -
|-
| style="background-color:#5cbdbb;" |
| style="text-align:left;" | Derek Kerr
| style="text-align:right;" | 483
| style="text-align:right;" | 8.82%
| style="text-align:right;" | -
|-
| style="text-align:right;background-color:#FFFFFF;" colspan="2" |Total votes
| style="text-align:right;background-color:#FFFFFF;" |5,478
| style="text-align:right;background-color:#FFFFFF;" |
| style="text-align:right;" |
|- 
| style="text-align:right;background-color:#FFFFFF;" colspan="2" |Registered voters
| style="text-align:right;background-color:#FFFFFF;" |
| style="text-align:right;background-color:#FFFFFF;" |
| style="text-align:right;" |
|- 
| style="text-align:left;" colspan="6" |Note: All Hamilton Municipal Elections are officially non-partisan.  Note: Candidate campaign colours are based on the prominent colour used in campaign items (signs, literature, etc.)and are used as a visual differentiation between candidates.
|- 
| style="text-align:left;" colspan="13" |Sources: 
|}

|-
!rowspan="2" colspan="2"|Candidate
!colspan="3"|Popular vote
|-
! Votes
! %
! ±%
|-
| style="background-color:#BCEDF6;" |
| style="text-align:left;" | Reg Woodworth (incumbent)
!colspan="3" style="text-align:center;" | Acclaimed
|-
| style="text-align:right;background-color:#FFFFFF;" colspan="2" |Total votes
| style="text-align:right;background-color:#FFFFFF;" |
| style="text-align:right;background-color:#FFFFFF;" |
| style="text-align:right;" |
|- 
| style="text-align:right;background-color:#FFFFFF;" colspan="2" |Registered voters
| style="text-align:right;background-color:#FFFFFF;" |
| style="text-align:right;background-color:#FFFFFF;" |
| style="text-align:right;" |
|- 
| style="text-align:left;" colspan="6" |Note: All Hamilton Municipal Elections are officially non-partisan.  Note: Candidate campaign colours are based on the prominent colour used in campaign items (signs, literature, etc.)and are used as a visual differentiation between candidates.
|- 
| style="text-align:left;" colspan="13" |Sources: 
|}

Catholic School Board Election

|-
!rowspan="2" colspan="2"|Candidate
!colspan="3"|Popular vote
|-
! Votes
! %
! ±%
|-
| style="background-color:#ffffff;" |
| style="text-align:left;" | Lewis Agro
| style="text-align:right;" | 1,160
| style="text-align:right;" | 38.1%
| style="text-align:right;" | -
|-
| style="background-color:#ffffff;" |
| style="text-align:left;" | John Lewis
| style="text-align:right;" | 969
| style="text-align:right;" | 31.8%
| style="text-align:right;" | -
|-
| style="background-color:#ffffff;" |
| style="text-align:left;" | Joe Barbera
| style="text-align:right;" | 667
| style="text-align:right;" | 21.9%
| style="text-align:right;" | -
|-
| style="background-color:#ffffff;" |
| style="text-align:left;" | Branko Radisic
| style="text-align:right;" | 251
| style="text-align:right;" | 8.2%
| style="text-align:right;" | -
|-
| style="text-align:right;background-color:#FFFFFF;" colspan="2" |Total votes
| style="text-align:right;background-color:#FFFFFF;" |3,047
| style="text-align:right;background-color:#FFFFFF;" |
| style="text-align:right;" |
|- 
| style="text-align:right;background-color:#FFFFFF;" colspan="2" |Registered voters
| style="text-align:right;background-color:#FFFFFF;" |
| style="text-align:right;background-color:#FFFFFF;" |
| style="text-align:right;" |
|- 
| style="text-align:left;" colspan="6" |Note: All Hamilton Municipal Elections are officially non-partisan.  Note: Candidate campaign colours are based on the prominent colour used in campaign items (signs, literature, etc.)and are used as a visual differentiation between candidates.
|- 
| style="text-align:left;" colspan="13" |Sources: 
|}

|-
!rowspan="2" colspan="2"|Candidate
!colspan="3"|Popular vote
|-
! Votes
! %
! ±%
|-
| style="background-color:#ffffff"|
| style="text-align:left;" | Ralph Agostino
!colspan="3" style="text-align:center;" | Acclaimed
|-
| style="text-align:right;background-color:#FFFFFF;" colspan="2" |Total votes
| style="text-align:right;background-color:#FFFFFF;" |
| style="text-align:right;background-color:#FFFFFF;" |
| style="text-align:right;" |
|- 
| style="text-align:right;background-color:#FFFFFF;" colspan="2" |Registered voters
| style="text-align:right;background-color:#FFFFFF;" |
| style="text-align:right;background-color:#FFFFFF;" |
| style="text-align:right;" |
|- 
| style="text-align:left;" colspan="6" |Note: All Hamilton Municipal Elections are officially non-partisan.  Note: Candidate campaign colours are based on the prominent colour used in campaign items (signs, literature, etc.)and are used as a visual differentiation between candidates.
|- 
| style="text-align:left;" colspan="13" |Sources: 
|}

|-
!rowspan="2" colspan="2"|Candidate
!colspan="3"|Popular vote
|-
! Votes
! %
! ±%
|-
| style="background-color:#ffffff"|
| style="text-align:left;" | Joseph Baiardo
!colspan="3" style="text-align:center;" | Acclaimed
|-
| style="text-align:right;background-color:#FFFFFF;" colspan="2" |Total votes
| style="text-align:right;background-color:#FFFFFF;" |
| style="text-align:right;background-color:#FFFFFF;" |
| style="text-align:right;" |
|- 
| style="text-align:right;background-color:#FFFFFF;" colspan="2" |Registered voters
| style="text-align:right;background-color:#FFFFFF;" |
| style="text-align:right;background-color:#FFFFFF;" |
| style="text-align:right;" |
|- 
| style="text-align:left;" colspan="6" |Note: All Hamilton Municipal Elections are officially non-partisan.  Note: Candidate campaign colours are based on the prominent colour used in campaign items (signs, literature, etc.)and are used as a visual differentiation between candidates.
|- 
| style="text-align:left;" colspan="13" |Sources: 
|}

|-
!rowspan="2" colspan="2"|Candidate
!colspan="3"|Popular vote
|-
! Votes
! %
! ±%
|-
| style="background-color:#ffffff"|
| style="text-align:left;" | Kyran Kennedy
!colspan="3" style="text-align:center;" | Acclaimed
|-
| style="text-align:right;background-color:#FFFFFF;" colspan="2" |Total votes
| style="text-align:right;background-color:#FFFFFF;" |
| style="text-align:right;background-color:#FFFFFF;" |
| style="text-align:right;" |
|- 
| style="text-align:right;background-color:#FFFFFF;" colspan="2" |Registered voters
| style="text-align:right;background-color:#FFFFFF;" |
| style="text-align:right;background-color:#FFFFFF;" |
| style="text-align:right;" |
|- 
| style="text-align:left;" colspan="6" |Note: All Hamilton Municipal Elections are officially non-partisan.  Note: Candidate campaign colours are based on the prominent colour used in campaign items (signs, literature, etc.)and are used as a visual differentiation between candidates.
|- 
| style="text-align:left;" colspan="13" |Sources: 
|}

|-
!rowspan="2" colspan="2"|Candidate
!colspan="3"|Popular vote
|-
! Votes
! %
! ±%
|-
| style="background-color:#ffffff"|
| style="text-align:left;" | Pat Daly
!colspan="3" style="text-align:center;" | Acclaimed
|-
| style="text-align:right;background-color:#FFFFFF;" colspan="2" |Total votes
| style="text-align:right;background-color:#FFFFFF;" |
| style="text-align:right;background-color:#FFFFFF;" |
| style="text-align:right;" |
|- 
| style="text-align:right;background-color:#FFFFFF;" colspan="2" |Registered voters
| style="text-align:right;background-color:#FFFFFF;" |
| style="text-align:right;background-color:#FFFFFF;" |
| style="text-align:right;" |
|- 
| style="text-align:left;" colspan="6" |Note: All Hamilton Municipal Elections are officially non-partisan.  Note: Candidate campaign colours are based on the prominent colour used in campaign items (signs, literature, etc.)and are used as a visual differentiation between candidates.
|- 
| style="text-align:left;" colspan="13" |Sources: 
|}

|-
!rowspan="2" colspan="2"|Candidate
!colspan="3"|Popular vote
|-
! Votes
! %
! ±%
|-
| style="background-color:#ffffff;" |
| style="text-align:left;" | Sergio Manchia
| style="text-align:right;" | 3,574
| style="text-align:right;" | 69%
| style="text-align:right;" | -
|-
| style="background-color:#ffffff;" |
| style="text-align:left;" | Tom Wigglesworth
| style="text-align:right;" | 1,605
| style="text-align:right;" | 31%
| style="text-align:right;" | -
|-
| style="text-align:right;background-color:#FFFFFF;" colspan="2" |Total votes
| style="text-align:right;background-color:#FFFFFF;" |5,179
| style="text-align:right;background-color:#FFFFFF;" |
| style="text-align:right;" |
|- 
| style="text-align:right;background-color:#FFFFFF;" colspan="2" |Registered voters
| style="text-align:right;background-color:#FFFFFF;" |
| style="text-align:right;background-color:#FFFFFF;" |
| style="text-align:right;" |
|- 
| style="text-align:left;" colspan="6" |Note: All Hamilton Municipal Elections are officially non-partisan.  Note: Candidate campaign colours are based on the prominent colour used in campaign items (signs, literature, etc.)and are used as a visual differentiation between candidates.
|- 
| style="text-align:left;" colspan="13" |Sources: 
|}

|-
!rowspan="2" colspan="2"|Candidate
!colspan="3"|Popular vote
|-
! Votes
! %
! ±%
|-
| style="background:#ffffff;"|
| style="text-align:left;" | Mary Nardini (incumbent)
| style="text-align:right;" |5,023
| style="text-align:right;" |33.1%
| style="text-align:right;" |
|-
| style="background:#ffffff;"|
| style="text-align:left;" | Raymond Bartolotti
| style="text-align:right;" |3,450
| style="text-align:right;" |22.8%
| style="text-align:right;" |
|-
| style="background:#ffffff;"|
| style="text-align:left;" | C. D'Angelo
| style="text-align:right;" |3,253
| style="text-align:right;" |21.5%
| style="text-align:right;" |-
|-  
| style="background:#ffffff;"|
| style="text-align:left;" | R. Menegazzo
| style="text-align:right;" |2,389
| style="text-align:right;" |15.8%
| style="text-align:right;" |-
|-  
| style="background:#ffffff;"|
| style="text-align:left;" | A. Magnini
| style="text-align:right;" |1,046
| style="text-align:right;" |6.9%
| style="text-align:right;" |-
|-  
| style="text-align:right;background-color:#FFFFFF;" colspan="2" |Total votes
| style="text-align:right;background-color:#FFFFFF;" |
| style="text-align:right;background-color:#FFFFFF;" |
| style="text-align:right;" |
|- 
| style="text-align:right;background-color:#FFFFFF;" colspan="2" |Registered voters
| style="text-align:right;background-color:#FFFFFF;" |
| style="text-align:right;background-color:#FFFFFF;" |
| style="text-align:right;" |
|- 
| style="text-align:left;" colspan="6" |1 These candidates did not submit official Financial Statements and are, therefore, ineligible to run in the  2018 Municipal election Note: This ward elected two Catholic trustees and percentages are specific to each candidate, not for the overall total.Note: All Hamilton Municipal Elections are officially non-partisan.  Note: Candidate campaign colours are based on the prominent colour used in campaign items (signs, literature, etc.)and are used as a visual differentiation between candidates.
|- 
| style="text-align:left;" colspan="13" |Sources: 
|}

|-
!rowspan="2" colspan="2"|Candidate
!colspan="3"|Popular vote
|-
! Votes
! %
! ±%
|-
| style="background-color:#ffffff"|
| style="text-align:left;" | Carolyn Cornale
!colspan="3" style="text-align:center;" | Acclaimed
|-
| style="text-align:right;background-color:#FFFFFF;" colspan="2" |Total votes
| style="text-align:right;background-color:#FFFFFF;" |
| style="text-align:right;background-color:#FFFFFF;" |
| style="text-align:right;" |
|- 
| style="text-align:right;background-color:#FFFFFF;" colspan="2" |Registered voters
| style="text-align:right;background-color:#FFFFFF;" |
| style="text-align:right;background-color:#FFFFFF;" |
| style="text-align:right;" |
|- 
| style="text-align:left;" colspan="6" |Note: All Hamilton Municipal Elections are officially non-partisan.  Note: Candidate campaign colours are based on the prominent colour used in campaign items (signs, literature, etc.)and are used as a visual differentiation between candidates.
|- 
| style="text-align:left;" colspan="13" |Sources: 
|}

See also
List of Hamilton, Ontario municipal elections

References

2003 Ontario municipal elections
2003